Plopana is a commune in Bacău County, Western Moldavia, Romania. It is composed of nine villages: Budești, Dorneni, Fundu Tutovei, Ițcani, Plopana, Rusenii Răzești, Rusenii de Sus, Străminoasa and Țâgâra.

References

Communes in Bacău County
Localities in Western Moldavia